LWT may refer to:

Louis William Tomlinson
 London Weekend Television, ITV network franchise holder for Greater London
 Lebensmittel-Wissenschaft & Technologie (Food Science and Technology) a Swiss academic journal
 Lewotobi language (ISO 639 language code: lwt)
 Lilongwe Wildlife Trust, for the Lilongwe Wildlife Centre
 Light Weight Tank, a version of the Space Shuttle external tank
 Lincolnshire Wildlife Trust
 Lewistown Municipal Airport (IATA airport code: LWT; ICAO airport code: KLWT), Montana, USA

See also

 
 
 IWT (disambiguation)
 LTW (disambiguation)
 TWL (disambiguation)
 TLW (disambiguation)
 WTL (disambiguation)
 WLT (disambiguation)